Neufchâtel-Hardelot is a commune in the Pas-de-Calais department in the Hauts-de-France region of France.

The commune houses a PGL hotel named Le Pré Catelan.

Geography
Junction 27 of the A16 autoroute is just within the commune’s territory, the western border of which is formed by the English Channel.

History
At the end of the 7th century, the grassy dunes area was known as "Mont Saint-Frieux", 153 metres above sea level, where a village was first built. The name later became Saint-Férieux.

The name Neufchâtel has its origins in a castle, in this case the Chateau de Bellefontaine, which was engulfed by shifting sands. This may be the "Novum Castellum" that gave its name to Neufchâtel. Opinion is divided.  The name Neufchâtel was recorded here for the first time in 1173 and again in 1199 in the charter of Samer.

In the early 1900s, Hardelot was lined with white sand dunes facing the sea and a  forest. It attracted many hunters of deer, wild boar, hares, rabbits, partridge, snipe and pheasant.

In 1905, an English patron, John Robinson Whitley, and his French friends bought  hectares of land and created the Hardelot company. Whitley had already owned Hardelot castle since 1897, and was one of the promoters of Le Touquet-Paris-Plage. He wanted to develop Hardelot as a new and fashionable resort and a world centre of sports.

From 1908 onwards, 20 new villas were built around the tennis courts on the seafront by the famous architect Louis-Marie Cordonnier, a friend of John Whitley, who designed these vast and unique villas that today characterize Hardelot. In 1911, aviator Louis Blériot had a villa built near the levee. Harriet Quimby, the first woman to fly across the Channel, flew from Dover to Hardelot-Plage on 16 April 1912. Around that time, some of the first land yachting races were held here, attracting many followers to the beach.

During the Second World War, Hardelot was occupied and looted by the Germans and blown up by Allied bombing in 1944.

Since then, Hardelot-Plage has been rebuilt. It is still littered with the numerous villas hidden in pine forests which have made its name. It is also a prominent sporting place with two golf courses as well as tennis and equestrian clubs.

Population

Places of interest
 The church of St.Pierre, dating from the sixteenth century.
 A house named after the singer Madonna.
 Saint-Augustin’s church at Hardelot.
 The thirteenth century castle.
 Two ancient manorhouses.

See also
Communes of the Pas-de-Calais department

References

External links

 Official Town website
  Official Tourist website
 Official website: Tourism in Boulogne and the Boulonnais region
 Photos of Hardelot Plage

Neufchatelhardelot